David Allen Cahill (July 26, 1941 - November 12, 2012) was an American football defensive tackle who played professionally in the National Football League (NFL). Cahill first played with the Philadelphia Eagles during the 1966 NFL season. He was selected by the New Orleans Saints in the 1967 NFL Expansion Draft, but played that season with the Los Angeles Rams. After a year away from the NFL, he played with the Atlanta Falcons during the 1969 NFL season.

References

1942 births
2012 deaths
American football defensive tackles
Atlanta Falcons players
Los Angeles Rams players
Northern Arizona Lumberjacks football players
Philadelphia Eagles players
People from Stanley, Wisconsin
Sportspeople from Tempe, Arizona
Players of American football from Wisconsin
Players of American football from Arizona